Asif Zakir (born 1 September 1983) is a Pakistani first-class cricketer who plays for Sui Southern Gas Company. He scored the most runs in the 2015–16 Quaid-e-Azam Trophy, with a total of 791 for the tournament. In March 2017, he was named in Pakistan's One Day International (ODI) squad for their series against the West Indies.

In September 2019, he was named in Balochistan's squad for the 2019–20 Quaid-e-Azam Trophy tournament.

References

External links
 

1983 births
Living people
Pakistani cricketers
Defence Housing Authority cricketers
Sindh cricketers
Sui Southern Gas Company cricketers
Cricketers from Karachi